Schiller Park is a village in Cook County, Illinois, United States. The population was 11,709 at the 2020 census.

Geography

Demographics
As of the 2020 census there were 11,709 people, 4,437 households, and 3,105 families residing in the village. The racial makeup of the village was 64.45% White, 1.67% African American, 1.43% Native American, 7.01% Asian, 0.03% Pacific Islander, 14.63% from other races, and 10.79% from two or more races. Hispanic or Latino of any race were 30.99% of the population.

There were 4,437 households, out of which 45.50% had children under the age of 18 living with them, 49.36% were married couples living together, 9.13% had a female householder with no husband present, and 30.02% were non-families. 24.39% of all households were made up of individuals, and 6.22% had someone living alone who was 65 years of age or older. The average household size was 3.13 and the average family size was 2.59.

The village's age distribution consisted of 21.3% under the age of 18, 8.1% from 18 to 24, 25.6% from 25 to 44, 28.5% from 45 to 64, and 16.5% who were 65 years of age or older. The median age was 41.6 years. For every 100 females, there were 113.3 males. For every 100 females age 18 and over, there were 117.3 males.

The median income for a household in the village was $58,637, and the median income for a family was $72,034. Males had a median income of $42,821 versus $35,103 for females. The per capita income for the village was $30,168. About 9.3% of families and 12.3% of the population were below the poverty line, including 26.3% of those under age 18 and 6.6% of those age 65 or over.

Education

Schiller Park School District 81 operates public schools.

The Roman Catholic Archdiocese of Chicago operates Catholic schools. St. Maria Goretti School is in Schiller Park. From circa 2017 to 2020 the student population declined by 73. The archdiocese stated that the school could remain open if it had 150 students for 2019–2020, but the student population was below that. The archdiocese decided that the school will close after spring 2020.""

Sister cities
 Capurso (Italy), 1994

Notable people
Edward Bluthardt (1916-1993), Illinois state representative and lawyer; Bluthardt served as mayor of Schiller Park.

See also 

 Schiller Woods magic water pump

References

External links
 Village of Schiller Park official website

Villages in Illinois
Villages in Cook County, Illinois
Chicago metropolitan area